Crossodactylodes izecksohni (common name: Izecksohn's bromeliad frog) is a species of frog in the family Leptodactylidae.
It is endemic to Santa Teresa in Espírito Santo state of eastern Brazil.

Etymology
The specific name izecksohni honours Eugênio Izecksohn, a Brazilian herpetologist.

Habitat and conservation
It inhabits forests and forest edges where its habitat is terrestrial and epiphytic bromeliads where its tadpoles develop. Its known range is within a protected area but habitat loss is occurring nearby. While its known range is very small, it is locally abundant.

References

izecksohni
Endemic fauna of Brazil
Amphibians of Brazil
Amphibians described in 1983
Taxonomy articles created by Polbot